The 1986–87 Bucknell Bison men's basketball team represented Bucknell University during the 1986–87 NCAA Division I men's basketball season. The Bison, led by head coach Charles Woollum, played their home games at Davis Gym and were members of the East Coast Conference. They finished the season 22–9, 11–3 in Patriot League play to be crowned regular season champions. They were also champions of the ECC tournament to earn an automatic bid to the 1987 NCAA tournament – the first NCAA Tournament appearance in school history – where they lost in the first round to No. 1 seed Georgetown, 75–53.

Roster

Schedule and results

|-
!colspan=9 style=| Regular season

|-
!colspan=9 style=| ECC tournament

|-
!colspan=9 style=| NCAA tournament

References

Bucknell Bison men's basketball seasons
Bucknell
Bucknell
Bucknell Bison
Bucknell Bison